Countryballs, also known as Polandball, is an art style and internet meme used in online comic strips in which countries are typically personified as imperfect spherical characters (there are some exceptions, such as Israel, Nepal, Kazakhstan, Singapore, who are not portrayed as balls) decorated with their country's flag. The characters often interact in broken English characterized with vocabularies of their national languages (e.g., France's broken English is interspersed with French words). The comics poke fun at national stereotypes, international relations and historical conflicts.

Background

Countryballs have their roots on drawball.com, a website that allowed Internet users to draw whatever they want on a circular canvas called a "drawball". In August 2008, thousands of Polish netizens took over the entire drawball with an illustration of the Polish flag. The circular canvas constrained the flag in such a way that it became a literal "Poland ball".

The beginning of the Countryballs format proper is credited to Falco, a British user on the German imageboard Krautchan.net who used Microsoft Paint to create a meme of Wojak – a Polish Internet troll on the same board who contributed in broken English. After this, creating Countryballs cartoons became popular among other users on the board, particularly Russians.

Popularity
The style soon grew in popularity on the internet as a whole as a meme, having dedicated communities on platforms such as Reddit and Facebook. The popularity of the style has been attributed to the ability of the drawings to tell short stories of nations in a easily understandable fashion, often with a large amount of jokes and comical undertones, with the characterization of a group lending itself towards a short comic format.

Themes

Poland

The premise of Countryballs is that they represent the country and its history, foreign relations and stereotypes, focusing on megalomania and national complexes. With the exception of Anglophone countries, the dialogue of Countryballs tends to be written in broken English and Internet slang, reminiscent of the lolcat meme, and by the end of a cartoon, Poland is typically seen weeping.

Polandball's depiction of Poland portrays a number of stereotypes. These include bad English use by Poles, blaming others for its failures in particular given the backdrop of repeated invasions by its neighbours (such as the 18th-century partitions and World War II), Polish propensity for telling tales of the glorious past, and the perception of Poles as "dull-witted" and "psycho-Catholic".

Some Polandball comics arise from the premise that some countries can fly into space, whilst Poland cannot. One of the earliest Polandball comics begins with the premise that Earth is going to be struck by a giant meteor, leading to all countries with space technology leaving Earth and going into orbit around the planet. At the end of the cartoon, Poland, still on earth, is crying, and in broken English pronounces the canonical Polandball catchphrase "Poland cannot into space". In this humorous way, other Countryballs put a halt to all discussion with Poles on which country is superior.

Other countries 
Countryballs can also include comics on other countries: these comics are sometimes still referred to as Polandball comics, although they are more commonly also referred to as Countryballs. States, provinces, and other such divisions can also be used, along with multinational organisations such as the European Union, NATO and the United Nations, as well as countries and empires which formerly existed such as the Roman Empire.

There are various other established conventions. For example, the United Kingdom most frequently wears a monocle and a top hat, often holds a cup of tea, and often talks about when it was a superpower. The United States is frequently depicted wearing big black sunglasses, and having an egocentric personality. In a more bizarre example, Israel is almost always depicted as a cube, and a common joke is that Israel is depicted this way because of "Jewish physics". Coats of arms in the upper hoist side are most often depicted as eyepatches; the civil ensign which depicts Austria-Hungary in the comics has two coat of arms, rendering the countryball either blind or wearing tinted glasses. Montenegro is frequently depicted as very sleepy and lazy, referring to real-world "Lazy Olympics".

The simplicity of Countryballs, together with its recognition of world history and a focus on current affairs, makes the meme suited to commenting on international events. Amongst events which have been covered by Countryballs and have been noted in the media, are the Senkaku Islands dispute, the 2013 papal conclave which saw Jorge Mario Bergoglio being elected as the new Pope, the Revolution of Dignity, the annexation of Crimea by the Russian Federation and issues relating to Filipino workers in Taiwan.
In the prelude to the 2022 Russian invasion of Ukraine and after the invasion, Ukraine and Russia saw an increase in comic appearances.

Assessment

A report on the Russian radio station Vesti FM noted a post on Livejournal which asked readers to list five images that come to mind when thinking of Poland or Poles. The five pages of responses, illustrating the complex and often difficult historical ties between Russia and Poland, recalled subjects including False Dmitriy I, Tomek in the Land of the Kangaroos by Polish author Alfred Szklarski, Czterej pancerni i pies ("Four tank-men and a dog"), Russophobia and Polandball.

Wojciech Oleksiak, writing on culture.pl, a project of the Polish government-funded Adam Mickiewicz Institute which has the aim of promoting Polish language and culture abroad, noted that due to anyone being able to create a Polandball comic, the existence of the meme has created new opportunities for people to express their personal views on race, religion and history. In describing Polandball as the Internet meme par excellence, he further stated that comic plots can be "rude, impolite, racist, abusive, or just plain dumb", whilst also noting that the politically incorrect nature of the comics add to the attractiveness of the meme.

At the same time, Oleksiak notes that Polandball comics often employ exaggerated Polish stereotypes, such as Poles not being as proficient in English as other nationalities, and Poland itself being a country full of dull-witted hyper-Catholics. On the other hand, he admits that some stereotypes employed in Polandball comics, such as Poles telling stories about the nation's glorious history and dwelling on a deep rooted martyrdom, are mostly true; whilst the stereotype that Poles hold many national complexes and blame external forces for their own failures, is true, but somewhat justified.

Oleksiak further notes that from Polandball, Poles can learn to have "a sense of humour about our long-time grudges".

In popular culture

An online multiplayer third-person shooter called Countryballs: Modern Ballfare released on Steam in June 2021 for Microsoft Windows.

See also
 Pearls Before Swine (comic)
 Social commentary
 Editorial cartoon
 Polonophile
 Political humour
 Culture of Poland
 List of Internet memes
 Hetalia
 Year Hare Affair

Notes

References

External links

 Polandball subreddit

2000s webcomics
2009 comics debuts
2010s webcomics
2020s webcomics
American political satire
American webcomics
Ethnic and racial stereotypes
Fictional balls
Internet memes introduced in 2009
National personifications in comic books
Poland in fiction
Political Internet memes
Political webcomics
Satirical comics
Works about Poland
Internet memes